The 2020–21 Maryland Terrapins women's basketball team represented the University of Maryland, College Park in 2020–21 NCAA Division I women's basketball season. The Terrapins were led by nineteenth year head coach Brenda Frese and played their home games at the Xfinity Center as members of the Big Ten Conference.

Previous season
The Terrapins finished the 2019–20 season 28–4 (16–2) in Big Ten play to finish tied for 1st place and capturing their 5th Big Ten title.  Also winning the Big Ten tournament title for the 4th time in school history.

Offseason

2020 recruiting class

Incoming Transfers

Player departures

Awards and honors
Coach Brenda Frese voted Big Ten Coach of the Year(coaches/media), National Coach of the Year by ESPN, and AP National Coach of the Year

Watch List

Honors

Roster

Schedule

|-
!colspan=9 style=| Big Ten tournament
|-

|-
!colspan=9 style=| NCAA Women's Tournament

Rankings

*AP does not release post-NCAA Tournament rankings*Coaches did not release a Week 2 poll.

References

External links
 Official Team Website

Maryland Terrapins women's basketball seasons
Maryland
Maryland
Maryland
Maryland